Samuel George Alan Edmundson (born 15 August 1997) is an English professional footballer who plays as a centre-back for EFL League One club Ipswich Town.

Born in Manchester, Edmundson began his career at Oldham Athletic, joining the club's academy in 2013 and going on to make his senior debut in 2015. He spent six years at Oldham, spending time out on loan at Ramsbottom United, Alfreton Town and AFC Fylde during his time at the club. In June 2019, He joined Scottish club Rangers from Oldham. He spent two seasons at Rangers, including spending time out on loan at Derby County in 2021. He signed for Ipswich Town in July 2021.

Career

Oldham Athletic
Edmundson signed for Oldham Athletic on a two-year scholarship on 14 July 2013 at the age of 15. He signed a one-year professional contract on 13 May 2015. He was first included in a senior matchday squad on 22 August 2015, remaining an unused substitute in a 1–1 League One draw against Shrewsbury Town at Boundary Park. Nine days later, away to the same opposition, he made his senior debut in the first round of the Football League Trophy, playing the full 90 minutes of a 0–2 defeat at the New Meadow. He made 3 appearances for Oldham during his first season in senior football, whilst also spending time on loan at Northern Premier League side Ramsbottom United.

He made his first appearance of the 2016–17 season on 30 August, starting in a 4–5 home defeat against Carlisle United in an EFL Trophy group stage match. Edmundson made 5 appearances for Oldham during the season, while also spending time out on loan at Alfreton Town.

On 13 October 2017, Edmundson joined National League side AFC Fylde on a one-month loan deal along with teammate Jamie Stott. After impressing in his loan spell at AFC Fylde, Edmundson returned to Oldham Athletic in January 2018, working his way into the first-team upon his return. He scored his first goal for Oldham on the final day of the 2017–18 season, netting in a 2–2 draw with Northampton Town. He made 17 appearances for Oldham during the season, scoring once.

He started the opening match of the 2018–19 season against Milton Keynes Dons. On 16 August 2018, Edmundson signed a two-year contract extension with Oldham until the summer of 2020. He scored his first goal of the season in a 3–1 away win against Cambridge United on 17 November. During the 2018–19 season, Edmundson formed an impressive partnership with veteran defender Peter Clarke, being named in the EFL League Two Team of the Season, while also winning Oldham’s Players’ Player of the Season award. In total, he made 54 appearances in all competitions over the course of the season, scoring twice.

Rangers
Edmundson signed for Scottish club Rangers on 21 June 2019, for an undisclosed transfer fee, where he claimed the number 4 shirt he wore at Oldham. He made his Rangers and European competition debut on 18 July, starting against St. Joseph's of Gibraltar, in a 6–0 Rangers victory in the second leg of the Europa League first qualifying round. He scored his first goal for the club in a 2–1 home win against Hibernian at Ibrox on 5 February 2020. During his first season at Ibrox, Edmundson earned the nickname 'The Fridge' from his team-mates and the Rangers supporters. On 12 March 2020, he scored in a Europa League round of 16 first leg tie against Bayer Leverkusen, a match in which Rangers eventually lost 1–3. Edmundson made 16 appearances in all competitions during his first season at Rangers, scoring twice.

He made his first appearance of the 2020–21 season on 17 September in a UEFA Europa League second qualifying round tie against Lincoln Red Imps in which Rangers won 5–0. His first league appearance of the season came on 27 September, coming on as a second-half substitute in a 5–1 away win against Motherwell. On 2 November 2020 it was announced that Edmundson and Jordan Jones had been suspended by Rangers, pending an internal investigation, for attending a party and breaking coronavirus regulations. He did not feature for Rangers for the remainder of the season, making only two appearances for the club as Rangers won the Scottish Premiership title.

Derby County (loan)
On 1 February 2021, Edmundson joined Derby County on loan until the end of the 2020–21 season. He made his debut for Derby on 16 February in a 2–1 away win against Wycombe Wanderers. He scored his first goal for Derby in a 2–0 win against Huddersfield Town on 23 February 2021. Edmundson made 10 appearances for Derby during his loan spell, helping the club to stay in the Championship on the final day of the season, following a 3–3 draw against Sheffield Wednesday.

Ipswich Town
Edmundson signed for Ipswich Town on 27 July 2021, on a four-year deal, for an undisclosed fee. He made his debut for Ipswich on 11 September in a 2–5 home defeat against Bolton Wanderers at Portman Road. He scored his first goal for the club two games later, netting the final goal in a 6–0 home win against Doncaster Rovers at Portman Road. Edmundson quickly established himself as a key player in the Ipswich defence. On 25 January, he captained Ipswich for the first time in a 2–0 away win against AFC Wimbledon, as club captain Sam Morsy was suspended. He continued to captain the team for the following three matches before handing the armband back over to Morsy following his return from suspension. Edmundson suffered an ankle injury in a 2–0 win against Lincoln City on 8 March, ruling him out of action for the "foreseeable" future.

Career statistics

Honours
Individual
EFL League Two Team of the Season: 2018–19
Oldham Athletic Players' Player of the Season: 2018–19

References

External links
George Edmundson profile at the Ipswich Town F.C. website

1997 births
Living people
English footballers
Footballers from Manchester
Association football defenders
Oldham Athletic A.F.C. players
Ramsbottom United F.C. players
Alfreton Town F.C. players
AFC Fylde players
Rangers F.C. players
Derby County F.C. players
Ipswich Town F.C. players
English Football League players
Northern Premier League players
National League (English football) players
Scottish Professional Football League players